The ochre-collared monarch or rufous-collared monarch (Arses insularis) is a species of bird in the family Monarchidae.
It is found in Yapen and northern New Guinea.
Its natural habitats are subtropical or tropical moist lowland forests and subtropical or tropical moist montane forests.

Taxonomy and systematics
This species was originally described in the genus Monarcha. Some authorities consider the ochre-collared monarch as a subspecies of the frilled monarch.

References

ochre-collared monarch
Birds of New Guinea
ochre-collared monarch
Taxonomy articles created by Polbot